Isoken is a 2017 romantic comedy film written and directed by Jadesola Osiberu (in her directorial debut). The film stars Dakore Akande, Joseph Benjamin, and Marc Rhys.

The film was produced by Tribe85 productions and distributed by Silverbird Distributions in Nigeria and Evrit film in the UK. It premiered in the United Kingdom on 24 May 2017 at the West End's Cineworld in London and then in Nigeria on 16 June 2017 at the Landmark event center, Victoria Island, Lagos. The movie is one of the creative industry projects under the NollyFund loan scheme supported by the Bank of Industry.

Plot summary 
Everyone in the Osayande family worries about Isoken. Although she has what appears to have a perfect life – beautiful, successful and surrounded by great family and friends – Isoken is still unmarried at 34 which, in a culture obsessed with marriage, is serious cause for concern. Things come to a head at her youngest sister's wedding when her overbearing mother thrusts her into an orchestrated matchmaking with the ultimate Edo man, Osaze. Osaze is handsome, successful and from a good family, making him perfect Nigerian husband material. But in an unexpected turn of events, Isoken meets Kevin who she finds herself falling in love with and he just might be what she truly wants in a partner. The only problem is, not only is he not an Edo man, he is Oyinbo (white). Isoken is a romantic comedy that explores cultural expectations, racial stereotypes and the bonds that unite families in touching, dramatic and comedic ways.

Cast 
Dakore Akande as Isoken
Joseph Benjamin as Osaze
Marc Rhys as Kevin
Funke Akindele as Agnes
Lydia Forson as Kukua
Damilola Adegbite as Joke
Tina Mba as mama Isoken
Patrick Doyle as Papa Isoken
Nedu Wazobia as Chuks
Jemima Osunde
Bolanle Olukanni as Rume
Rita Edwards as Aunty
Omasan Buwa as Aunty
Efa Iwara

Critical reception 
The movie was met with a lot of positive reviews. Although Nollywood Reinvented rated the movie 64%, they also state that if there's any one word befitting of describing this movie it would be "beautiful"

Isoken went on to gather several nominations and awards, winning the 2018 AMVCA Best Film West African and for best Best Director, Best Foreign Film at BronzeLens Film Festival 2018 in Atlanta and Prix du Public at Nollywood Week Paris also in 2018. Isoken established Jadesola as not just a film Director, but an award-winning director.

Awards

See also 
 List of Nigerian films of 2017

References

External links 
 
 

2010s English-language films
Films shot in Lagos
2017 romantic comedy-drama films
2017 films
English-language Nigerian films
Films set in Lagos
Nigerian romantic comedy-drama films
2017 comedy films
Films about race and ethnicity
Films about interracial romance
2017 drama films
2017 romantic comedy films
Nigerian romantic comedy films